Hüseyin Alp (May 12, 1935 – January 8, 1983) was a Turkish professional basketball player and supporting role movie actor. With his height of 2.15 m (7'1") tall, he was one of the tallest Turkish basketball players.

Early life
Alp was born 1935, in Kangal, Sivas Province.

Club career
Alp started playing basketball at the age of 27. From 1962 to 1974, he played at the center position, for the İTÜ and Altınordu teams. During his club career, he won six Turkish Super League championships (1967, 1968, 1970, 1971, 1972, 1973). He was the Turkish Super League's Top Scorer, in 1967 and 1974.

National team career
Alp was also a member of the senior Turkish national basketball team. With Turkey, he played in 73 games. He played at the 1971 EuroBasket.

Acting career
In addition to his basketball career, Alp starred in some Turkish made movies, in supporting roles, from 1965 to 1978. He played in roles that featured his giant-like appearance.

Filmography
 Kadın Okşanmak İster (1965)
 Tarkan Gümüş Eyer (1970) - as Giant
 Erkek Gibi Ölenler (1970)
 Tarkan Viking Kanı (1971) - Orso
 Kara Murat Şeyh Gaffar'a Karşı (1976)
 Babanın Evlatları (1977) - as Mafiosi boss Beşir

Death and legacy
Hüseyin Alp died on January 8, 1983, at the age of 48, in Istanbul. A junior women's basketball club, the "Kağıthane Hüseyin Alp S.K.", was formed in the Kağıthane district of Istanbul, in his honor.

References

External links
 
 FIBA Profile
 FIBA Europe Profile

1935 births
1983 deaths
People from Kangal
Turkish men's basketball players
Centers (basketball)
Turkish male film actors
İstanbul Teknik Üniversitesi B.K. players
20th-century Turkish male actors